Yukiyoshi is a masculine Japanese given name.

Possible writings
Yukiyoshi can be written using different combinations of kanji characters. Here are some examples: 

幸義, "happiness, justice"
幸善, "happiness, virtuous"
幸吉, "happiness, good luck"
幸宜, "happiness, best regards"
行義, "to go, justice"
行善, "to go, virtuous"
行吉, "to go, good luck"
之義, "of, justice"
之善, "of, virtuous"
之吉, "of, good luck"
志義, "determination, justice"
志善, "determination, virtuous"
恭善, "respectful, virtuous"
恭芳, "respectful, virtuous/fragrant"
雪芳, "snow, virtuous/fragrant"

The name can also be written in hiragana ゆきよし or katakana ユキヨシ.

Notable people with the name

, Japanese swimmer
Yukiyoshi Aoyama (青山 幸宜, 1854–1930), Japanese politician and last daimyō of Gujō Domain
Yukiyoshi Ōi (大井 行吉, 1542–1584), Japanese samurai
, Japanese businessman and writer

Japanese masculine given names